Rae Martin Taylor  (born 1935) is a retired senior Australian public servant and policymaker.

Education
Taylor is a University of Sydney graduate, with a bachelor's degree in Economics (with honours).

Career
Rae Taylor joined the Commonwealth Public Service at the Commonwealth Bureau of Census and Statistics in 1956. He subsequently was employed in the Department of Primary Industry, the Department of Trade and Industry, the Department of Territories and the Department of Housing. In 1969 Taylor joined the Department of Shipping and Transport, becoming a Deputy Secretary of the Department in 1975.

Taylor was appointed to his first Secretary role in December 1978, becoming head of the Department of Employment and Youth Affairs.

In May 1982, Taylor was shifted to a position as head of the Department of Transport and Construction. After the Hawke Government was elected in the 1983 federal election, Taylor was retained in only an acting role overseeing Commonwealth construction functions, becoming Acting Secretary of the Department of Housing and Construction. and Secretary of the Department of Transport.

Between February 1986 and July 1987, Taylor was Secretary of the Department of Aviation.

Taylor's final Secretary appointment was as head of the Department of Industrial Relations between July 1987 and March 1989.

In 1994, Taylor was appointed Board Chairman of the National Centre for Vocational Education Research Ltd.

In 1999 he was appointed Chairman of a steering group to oversee the second stage review of the Commonwealth Navigation Act.

Awards
Taylor was made an Officer of the Order of Australia in January 1987 for his public service.

References

1935 births
Australian public servants
Living people
Officers of the Order of Australia
University of Sydney alumni
People educated at North Sydney Boys High School